Corestheta insularis is a species of beetle in the family Cerambycidae. It was described by Pascoe in 1875. It is known from Australia.

References

Dorcadiini
Beetles described in 1875